Madureira is a lower middle-class neighborhood in the North Zone of the city of Rio de Janeiro, Brazil.

The suburb is the hub to several bus lines that reach several parts of the city of Rio de Janeiro. It is famous for being home of the samba schools Portela and Império Serrano, two of the most traditional samba schools of Rio de Janeiro.

Madureira borders other suburbs such as Cascadura, Cavalcanti, Vaz Lobo, Engenheiro Leal, Turiaçu, Campinho and Oswaldo Cruz, and it has approximately 50 thousand inhabitants.

People 
 Tia Surica, (1940), samba singer.
 Arlindo Cruz, samba singer.
Gerson King Combo (1943-2020), soul and funk singer.
Jorge Ben, singer.

Sports 
 Madureira Esporte Clube is the neighbourhood's football club. They play at Estádio Conselheiro Galvão, also located in the neighbourhood.

External links 
 Findarticles

Neighbourhoods in Rio de Janeiro (city)